Preston Davis may refer to:

 Preston Davis (American football) (born 1962), American football player
 Preston Davis (politician) (1907–1990), American politician